Gadget's Go Coaster (known as Chip 'n' Dale's Gadget Coaster in Disneyland) is a junior roller coaster at the Disneyland theme park in Anaheim, California, and Tokyo Disneyland theme park, located in Urayasu, Chiba, Japan, near Tokyo. It is based on the work of the character Gadget Hackwrench from the Disney animated series Chip 'n Dale: Rescue Rangers. Gadget is depicted on top of a small weather-vane on a building towards Chip and Dale's Tree House, as well as on a postage stamp in the attraction's loading area.

Both versions of the attraction are located in Mickey's Toontown, and the Disneyland version opened January 24, 1993, along with the rest of Mickey's Toontown. The Tokyo Disneyland version opened on April 15, 1996. It was the only remaining Disneyland ride to be based on a Disney Afternoon television series. It debuted three years after the show was canceled. At 0:44 seconds, it is the shortest attraction in Disneyland. The Disneyland version of Mickey's Toontown was closed from March 2022 to early 2023 for a refurbishment. When the coaster reopened, it received its current name as well as some new features.

Ride

Disneyland Version
When riders walk up to the front entrance, they see the sign. The ride is primarily for children and therefore has very small cars. While two children can easily fit into a single car, most adults would have to travel alone (or with a small child). Guests board a train modeled after a homemade plane.

Once on board, guests hear a safety spiel by Gadget (voiced by Tress MacNeille). Guests travel through Gadget's salvaged old comb, soup can and thread spool, and over Toon Lake. Near the end of the ride (the fastest turn), cartoon frogs squirt water above guests' heads. The coaster comes to a stop and pulls into the station. The riders then return to Toontown.

The attraction was closed for a refurbishment in March 2022 and reopened in early 2023 with its current name and also received new character figures Gadget, Chip, Dale, and Zipper from the television series.

Tokyo Disneyland Version
When riders walk up to the front entrance, they see the sign for Gadget's coaster made out of random items. Above the loading dock is a portrait of the Rescue Ranger on a postage stamp. The Go Coaster is primarily for children and therefore has very small cars. While two children can easily fit into a single car, most adults would have to travel alone (or with a small child). Guests board a train fashioned from acorns and scavenged parts.

Attraction facts

Disneyland
 Name: Gadget's Go Coaster (1993-2022); Chip 'n' Dale's Gadget Coaster (2023-present)
 Grand opening: January 24, 1993
 Designers: Walt Disney Imagineering, Vekoma, TOGO (Flounder's Flying Fish Coaster)
 Number of Trains: 1
 Capacity per Train: 16
 Number of Cabs per Train: 8
 Maximum seating capacity: 2 per row
 Train theme: Hand built acorn pods by Gadget
 Height requirement: 35" (89 cm)
 Ride length: 44 seconds
 Ride system: Roller coaster
 Sponsor: Sparkle Paper Towels (A Georgia-Pacific Company)

Tokyo Disneyland
 Grand opening: April 15, 1996
 Designers: Walt Disney Imagineering, Vekoma
 Number of Trains: 2
 Capacity per Train: 16
 Number of Cabs per Train: 8
 Maximum seating capacity: 2 per row
 Ride length: 1:00
 Ride system: Roller coaster

Image gallery

Related attractions
 Magic Kingdom
 The Barnstormer

See also
 List of Disneyland attractions
 List of amusement rides based on television franchises

References

External links

Official Page for attraction at Tokyo Disneyland

1993 establishments in California
2022 disestablishments in California 
1996 establishments in Japan
Amusement rides based on television franchises
Chip 'n Dale Rescue Rangers
Disneyland
Mickey's Toontown
Roller coasters at Tokyo Disneyland
Roller coasters introduced in 1993
Roller coasters that closed in 2022 
Roller coasters introduced in 2023
Walt Disney Parks and Resorts attractions